Underneath the Radar is the debut album by Underworld, released in 1988. The album was a success in Australia, South Africa and the US (where it reached number 139 on the Billboard 200).  The title track of the album was released as a single which reached top five on the ARIA singles charts and number seventy-four on the U.S. Billboard Hot 100.

The album was recorded in one continuous single take and was promoted as such to underscore the technical expertise of the band members. Promotional appearances for the album's release featured the band playing the entire album live and in sequence.

Critical reception
Trouser Press wrote that "Rupert Hine’s production of Underneath the Radar gives it a sturdy dance backbone and the familiar sound of late-'80s British techno- beat; Heaven 17 leaning towards the Thompson Twins." MusicHound Rock: The Essential Album Guide deemed the album "much more of a modern rock effort."

Track listing
All songs by Karl Hyde, Rick Smith, and Alfie Thomas.

Personnel
 Karl Hyde — lead vocals, guitars
 Alfie Thomas — guitars, backing vocals
 Rick Smith — keyboards, backing vocals
 Baz Allen — bass
 Bryn B. Burrows — drums

Production
Produced by: Rupert Hine
Recorded and Mixed by: Stephen W Tayler
Assisted by: Andrew Scarth

Charts

Certifications

References

1988 debut albums
Albums produced by Rupert Hine
Underworld (band) albums
Sire Records albums